Stony Beach is a hamlet in Saskatchewan.

Unincorporated communities in Saskatchewan
Pense No. 160, Saskatchewan
Division No. 6, Saskatchewan